The University of Reims Champagne-Ardenne (URCA), also known simply as the University of Reims, is a public university  based in Reims, France.

In addition to the main campus in Reims, the  university has several campuses located throughout the Grand Est region, in Châlons-en-Champagne, Charleville-Mézières, Chaumont, and Troyes.

History

Original university
The University of Reims was established in 1548, after the Cardinal of Lorraine met with Pope Paul III. The 'Collège des Bons-Enfants' Catholic school thus became a university, teaching the arts, theology, law and medicine. The university was closed in 1793 during the French Revolution, and reemerged in the 1960s.

Modern university
The Faculty of Science (1961), the Literary University College (1964), the University College of Law and Economics (1966), Reims University Technology Institute (1966), the Faculties of Medicine and Pharmacy (1967), the National School of Dental Surgery (1970) are the instutions from which the University of Reims was formed in 1971. The creation of an IUT in Troyes (1973), an Institute of Higher Technical Education (1985) and an IUT department (1995) in Charleville-Mezieres, the development of a delocalized office of the Faculties of Law, Economics and Humanities of Reims (1991) and the opening of an IUT department in Châlons-en-Champagne (1993) all became part of the university and in 1982, it was renamed the University of Reims Champagne-Ardenne.

List of Presidents
 Michel Devèze (historian), 1971-1976   
 Jean Le Men (pharmacist), 1976-1977   
 Lucien Bernard (physicist), 1977-1982   
 André Laberrigue (physicist), 1982-1987   
 Jean Raymond (anglicist), 1987-1992   
 Claude Severin (physician and dentist), 1992-1997   
 Jacques Meyer (mathematician), 1997-2002   
 Mary Gerard (physicist), 2002-2007   
 Richard Vistelle (chemist), 2007-2012   
 Gilles Baillat (director of the IUFMs), 2012-2016
 Guillaume Gelle, 2016-present

Organisation

Training and research
The University of Reims Champagne-Ardenne has 8 UFR:   
 Law and Political Science   
 Letters and Human Sciences   
 Economics and Social Sciences   
 Natural Sciences   
 Sciences and Techniques of Physical and Sports Activities   
 Medicine   
 Dentistry   
 Pharmacy

Schools and institutes
 2 IUT (the IUT of Reims-Châlons-Charleville and the IUT of Troyes)   
 ESIEC now named ESIReims   
 Institute for Higher Technical Training ( IFTS )   
 University Institute of Teacher Training (IUFMs)   
 School of Midwifery   
 University Center   
 Institute of Preparation for General Administration

Doctoral
The university has two doctoral schools: Humanities & Social Sciences, and Technology & Health Sciences.

Training and research

Training
The five major areas of training at the University of Reims Champagne-Ardenne are:   
 Arts, Humanities, Languages   
 Humanities and Social Sciences   
 Law, economics, management   
 Science, Technology, Health   
 Science and technology of physical and sporting activities

Research
Research at the University of Reims Champagne-Ardenne is structured around five departments:

The Life Sciences & Health department whose laboratories are:   
 IFR 53 - Research Institute Federations interactions Cells Micro-Environment. IFR 53   
 Epidemiological surveillance of vector-borne and parasitic diseases JE 2533   
 Extracellular matrix and cell dynamics (MEDyC) UMR 6237   
 Plasticity of the respiratory epithelium in normal and pathological processes Inserm 903 UMRS   
 Interfaces Biomaterials - Tissue Houses (IBTH) INSERM UMR-S 926   
 Cellular and molecular mechanisms involved in the pre-and postconditioning myocardial EA 3801   
 Cell Interactions-Parasites: Biodiversity, Pathogenesis, Resistance (ICP) EA 3800   
 Health, Aging, Quality of Life and Rehabilitation Topics Fragile EA 3797   
 Cellular patho-physiology and Human immune dysfunction. Therapeutic Approach EA 3798   
 Inflammation and immunity of the respiratory epithelium EA 4303      
The Mathematics, ICT & Nanotechnologies department, whose laboratories are:   
 Research Center for Science and Information Technology and Communication   
 Mathematics Laboratory Reims EA 4535   
 Microscopy and Laboratory Study of Nanostructures (lmen) EA 3799   
The Agro-Sciences & Sciences of the Universe and Environment department, whose laboratories are:   
 Study Group on Geomaterials and Natural Environments, Anthropogenic (GEGENAA) EA 3795   
 Group of Molecular Spectrometry and Atmospheric (GSMA) CNRS UMR 6089   
 Fractionation of Agricultural Resources and Environment (FARE) UMR INRA 614-A   
 Research Unit of the Vine and Wine Champagne - Stress and Environment EA 2069   
The Chemistry & Engineering Sciences department, whose laboratories are:   
 Institute of Molecular Chemistry of Reims (ICMR - CNRS-UMR 6229)   
 Laboratory Analysis of Mechanical Constraints - Dynamic interfaces transfers to CEA-3304-EA   
 Research Group in Engineering Sciences (GRESPI - EA 4301)       
The Humanities and Society Sciences department, whose laboratories are:   
 CEJESCO Centre for Legal Research on the effectiveness of continental systems - I 1978   
 CERHIC: Centre for Studies and Research in Cultural History - EA 2616   
 CIRLEP: Interdisciplinary Center for Research on Language and Thought - EA 4299   
 CLEA: Cognition, Language, Emotions, Acquisitions - I 2526   
 RTDC: Centre for Research on Territorial Decentralization - EA 3312   
 CRIMEL: Center for Interdisciplinary Research on Aesthetic and Literary Models - EA 3311   
 LIVE: Development and Political Geography - EA 2076   
 Laboratory of Applied Psychology - EA 4298   
 Lerp: Laboratory for study and research on the professionalization - EA 3313   
 MICIG: Contemporary Institutions Governance International Movements - I 2429   
 IMO commercial organizations and institutions - EA 2065

Notable faculty

Ancient
 Dermot O'Hurley (c.1530-1584) - professor of canon and civil law 1574-1588; Archbishop of Cashel, Ireland; executed for treason 
 Joseph-Ignace Guillotin (1738-1814) - physician, politician, and freemason; proposed use of a device to carry out death penalties

Modern
 Marie-Hélène Schwartz (1913-2013) - mathematician
 Yvonne Choquet-Bruhat (born 1923) - mathematician and physicist
 Michel Sanouillet (1924-2015) - art historian; specialist of the Dada movement
 Roger Brunet (born 1931) - geographer
 Michel Picard (writer) (born 1931) - writer and literary critic
 Alain Badiou (born 1937) - philosopher
 Jean-Pierre Néraudau (1940-1998) - writer and professor of Latin literature
 Claude Gauvard (born 1942) - historian and Middle Ages specialist
 François Jacques (1946-1992) - historian, a specialist on Ancient Rome 
 Michèle Artigue (born 1946) - expert in mathematics education, 
 Dominique Mulliez (born 1952) - epigrapher and Hellenist; head of the French School at Athens from 2002 to 2011
 Beatrice Heuser (born 1961) - historian and political scientist
 Alain Bui (born 1969) - specialist in information technology; president of Versailles Saint-Quentin-en-Yvelines University
 Laure Gauthier (born 1972) - writer and poet

Notable alumni

Ancient
 Dermod O'Meara (died 1646) - Irish physician and poet, author of the first medical work printed in Dublin in 1619
 George Leyburn (1597-1677) - English Catholic priest, who became President of the English College, Douai 
 David Hamilton (1663-1721) - Scottish physician to Queen Anne; diarist
 Claude-Nicolas Le Cat (1700-1768) - surgeon; science communicator
 Louis-Guillaume Le Veillard (1733–1794) - chemist; aristocrat
 Louis Antoine de Saint-Just (1767-1794]) - revolutionary, political philosopher, president of the French National Convention, Jacobin club leader, major figure of French Revolution

Modern 
 Janine Cossy (born 1950) - organic chemist
 Mustapha Mansouri (born 1953) - Moroccan politician 
 Filomena Embaló (born 1956) - Angolan-born Bissau-Guinean writer. 
 Bérengère Poletti (born 1959) - politician 
 Christiane Chabi-Kao (born 1963) - Beninese film director and screenwriter
 Xavier Bertrand (born 1965) - politician
 Hawa Ahmed Youssouf (born 1966) - Djiboutian civil servant and politician
 Nicolas Kazadi (born 1966) - Congolese politician and career diplomat who has
 Yann Moix (born 1968) - author, film director and television presenter
 Mylène Troszczynski (born 1972) - National Front Member of the European Parliament 2014-2019
 Alexis Lemaire (born 1980) - mental calculation world record holder
 Teguest Guerma - Ethiopian public health physician
 Ziad el-Doulatli - Tunisian activist affiliated with the Islamist Ennahda Movement 
 Pauline Lhote - winemaker based in Napa, California
 Ioan Horga - Romanian university professor of international relations and European studies

See also
 List of public universities in France by academy

References

External links
 Official website in English
 Official website in French

 
University of Reims Champagne-Ardenne
Educational institutions established in 1967
1967 establishments in France
Universities and colleges in Reims
Reims